Buffalo Creek is a tributary of the Allegheny River in Armstrong and Butler counties, Pennsylvania in the United States.

Buffalo Creek joins the Allegheny River at the borough of Freeport.

Tributaries
(Mouth at the Allegheny River)

Little Buffalo Creek
Sarver Run
Pine Run
Cornplanter Run
Rough Run
North Branch Rough Run
Sarver Run
Marrowbone Run
Patterson Creek
Long Run
Little Buffalo Run

Cornplanter Run
Cornplanter Run is a stream located just 5.6 miles from Freeport in South Buffalo township. It was once known as Cornplanter's Run, named for Chief Cornplanter whose people once resided near its mouth where they raised corn.

Political subdivisions
Buffalo Creek traverses the following political subdivisions, given in the order encountered traveling downstream.

Oakland Township, Butler County
Clearfield Township, Butler County
West Franklin Township, Armstrong County
North Buffalo Township, Armstrong County
South Buffalo Township, Armstrong County
Buffalo Township, Butler County
Freeport

See also
Tributaries of the Allegheny River
List of rivers of Pennsylvania
List of tributaries of the Allegheny River

References

External links

U.S. Geological Survey: PA stream gaging stations
Buffalo Creek Watershed Conservation Plan – Audubon Society of Western Pennsylvania

Rivers of Pennsylvania
Tributaries of the Allegheny River
Rivers of Armstrong County, Pennsylvania
Rivers of Butler County, Pennsylvania